The list gives the composition of the governments of the Republic of Lithuania from 1918 to 1940. During that period Lithuania was an independent republic. From 1918 to December 1926 it was a democracy and the governments were formed from members of various parties. After the coup of 1926, Lithuania was ruled by authoritarian Antanas Smetona and his party, the Lithuanian National Union. Only the last two governments included members from the opposition.

Sources sometimes give conflicting data about the ministers, especially from the early governments. That is because those governments were short-lived, formed during the time of war, and not well documented.

Governments

Notes

References
 
 
 
 
 

Lithuania
Legal history of Lithuania
Governments